Burrén and Burrena, known popularly as Las Dos Teticas, are twin hills in Aragon, Spain. They are located in the Fréscano municipal limits, near the road between this town and Mallén.

There are two ancient Iron Age Urnfield culture archaeological sites beneath the hills. These sites have been declared Bien de Interés Cultural in the heritage register of the Spanish Ministry of Culture.

These mountains are isolated hills visible from far away in the flat landscape of northern Campo de Borja comarca.

See also
Mountains of Aragon
Breast-shaped hills

References

External links
Yacimiento arqueológico de Burrén
Burrén y Burrena, las "dos teticas" con historia en Fréscano

Mountains of Aragon
Campo de Borja
Geography of the Province of Zaragoza
Bien de Interés Cultural landmarks in the Province of Zaragoza